Cat Dreams is a 2009 children's picture book by Ursula K. Le Guin and illustrated by S D Schindler. It is about a cat that has a nap, dreams of fantastical kitty things, like raining mice, is startled awake, then finds a nice human lap to snooze on.

Reception
Kirkus Reviews wrote of Cat Dreams "Easy rhyming text will be quickly memorized, but the realistic, full-bleed watercolor illustrations will keep youngsters turning the pages.", and concluded "A perfect fit for storytimes on cats, naps and dreams." 

Cat Dreams has also been reviewed by Publishers Weekly, Common Sense Media, Children's Book and Media Review, Booklist, School Library Journal, and Horn Book Guides.

References

External links
Library holdings of Cat Dreams

2009 children's books
American picture books
Books about cats
Works by Ursula K. Le Guin
Orchard Books books